Şadılı (also, Shadly and Shadyly) is a village and municipality in the Goranboy Rayon of Azerbaijan.  It has a population of 579.

References 

Populated places in Goranboy District